Louis Philip James Kimber (born 24 February 1997) is an English cricketer. He made his first-class debut on 26 March 2019, for Loughborough MCCU against Leicestershire, as part of the Marylebone Cricket Club University fixtures. Prior to his first-class debut, he scored 162 not out from 55 balls in a twenty over match for Lincolnshire against Northumberland in May 2018. He made his Twenty20 debut on 13 June 2021, for Leicestershire in the 2021 T20 Blast. He made his List A debut on 22 July 2021, for Leicestershire in the 2021 Royal London One-Day Cup.

References

External links
 

1997 births
Living people
Cricketers from Scunthorpe
English cricketers
Leicestershire cricketers
Lincolnshire cricketers
Loughborough MCCU cricketers